Wesley W. Simina (born 1961) is a Micronesian politician. He served as the Governor of Chuuk State, one of the four states that constitute the Federated States of Micronesia from July 2005 to July 2011.

Simina was re-elected to a second term as Governor of Chuuk in a 2009 runoff election against Gillian N. Doone, the son of former Governor Gideon Doone. He and Lt. Governor Johnson Elimo were sworn into their second terms on July 2, 2009, in an inauguration ceremony held at the Saramen Chuuk Development Center at Saramen Chuuk High School in Weno, Chuuk.

Simina resigned as governor in July 2011 to become Chuuk's at-large senator in the national Congress of the Federated States of Micronesia. Chuuk Lt. Governor Johnson Elimo immediately became the acting Governor of Chuuk upon Simina's resignations. Elimo won a special gubernatorial election on August 24, 2011, to serve out the remainder of Simina's unexpired term. Governor Elimo won the election with 7,945; Alexander Narruhn came in second with 6,913 votes, while Redley Killion placed third with 3,692.

Simina was elected as the Speaker of the Nineteenth Congress of the Federated States of Micronesia on 11 May 2015.

References

External links
 Simina wins Chuuk governor's runoff
 Pacific Partnership 2008

1961 births
Living people
People from Chuuk State
Governors of Chuuk State
Speakers of the Congress of the Federated States of Micronesia
Federated States of Micronesia politicians